Major-General Herman James Shelley Landon, (23 August 185916 October 1948), was a British Army officer. During the Boer War he commanded a battalion, and was promoted in the interwar period to take command of a brigade in the British Expeditionary Force. He commanded the brigade during the early fighting on the Western Front in the First World War, and succeeded to the command of 1st Infantry Division when his commanding officer was killed at the First Battle of Ypres; he later commanded four more New Army divisions during the war.

Early life

Herman Landon was born in August 1859, the son of Mary Maria née Edgar (1829–1912) and James Landon (1807–1879); he had one elder sister, Letitia Elizabeth Landon (1845–1915), and a substantially older stepsister, Geraldine Amelia Leigh (1845–1940). The family was comfortably well off, living in the respectable area of Paddington, London.

James Landon was an Indian cotton merchant; though predominantly involved in growing rather than processing, he had been responsible for setting up one of the first successful cotton mills in India, at Bharuch in Gujarat, in 1854. Later in the decade he advised Ranchhodlal Chhotalal on the development of a similar mill in Ahmedabad. He died in March 1879, leaving a substantial estate of eight to nine thousand pounds.

Herman Landon was educated at Harrow from 1874 to 1876, leaving just before his seventeenth birthday. He later attended the Royal Military College, Sandhurst, passing out in 1879 and taking a commission in the 6th Regiment of Foot. He served in the Sudan in 1898, where he saw action at the Battle of Atbara and the Battle of Omdurman, and was mentioned in despatches. He returned to Africa in 1900, in the Boer War, where he took temporary command of his battalion, the 2nd Royal Warwickshire Regiment, from March to November. For this service, he was again mentioned in despatches, as well as being given a brevet promotion to lieutenant-colonel.

Military career
He then was sent to India, where he joined the 1st Battalion of the Royal Warwickshires, and in 1902 was promoted to substantive lieutenant-colonel, and given command of the battalion. He remained in command until 1906, receiving a brevet promotion to colonel in 1904. From February to October 1906 he was on half-pay, and in October was appointed Inspector of Gymnasia in India. In 1907, he was promoted substantive colonel. He returned to an active command in 1910, when he was made a Brigadier-General and given command of 3rd Brigade. He was awarded CB in the 1911 Coronation Honours.

First World War
The 3rd Brigade, part of 1st Infantry Division, mobilised with the British Expeditionary Force on the outbreak of the First World War, and was sent to France. Landon commanded it during the Retreat from Mons, the Battle of the Marne and the Battle of the Aisne, and was promoted to Major-General in October. During the First Battle of Ypres, the divisional commander, Major-General Samuel Lomax, was killed in action, and Landon took acting command. By the end of the battle in November, he himself was invalided home, and was relieved as divisional commander by Major-General David Henderson. He was formally replaced in command of his brigade by Lieutenant-Colonel Richard Butler on 13 November.

On his recovery in December, he was appointed Inspector of Infantry, and early in 1915 was appointed to command the 9th (Scottish) Division of the New Army. He accompanied it to France, but was replaced in September due to ill health, before the division saw combat at the Battle of Loos. In October he took command of the 33rd Division, this time remaining with the division when it went into combat at the Battle of the Somme in July 1916. In September he was appointed to command the 35th Division, remaining with it until July 1917, when his health forced him to retire from active service. From August 1917 to May 1918 he commanded the 64th Division in the Home Forces, finally retiring from the Army on 19 August 1919.

During the war, he was Mentioned in Despatches three more times. After the War, he was appointed a Companion of the Order of St Michael and St George (CMG). He also received the Croix de Guerre and was appointed a Commander of the Belgian Order of Leopold.

Family
He married Christian Ethel Sharp (1876–1957) in 1903, and they had one daughter, Mary Christian Landon (1904–1968).

Herman died in 1948 at the family home in Scottow, Norfolk.

Notes

Sources

References

 Obituary in The Times, p. 7, 20 October 1948
 "LANDON, Major-Gen. Herman James Shelley", in 

|-
 

|-
 

|-
 

|-
 

|-
 

|-

1859 births
1948 deaths
Military personnel from London
British Army major generals
People educated at Harrow School
British Army personnel of the Second Boer War
British Army personnel of the Mahdist War
Graduates of the Royal Military College, Sandhurst
British Army generals of World War I
Royal Warwickshire Fusiliers officers
People from North Norfolk (district)

Companions of the Order of St Michael and St George
Companions of the Order of the Bath

Recipients of the Croix de Guerre 1914–1918 (France)